The Frozen Tears of Angels is the eighth album studio by the Italian symphonic power metal band Rhapsody of Fire. It was released on April 30, 2010 via Nuclear Blast. It is the first album to be released after a long hiatus, caused by a legal dispute with the band's previous label, Magic Circle Music. The concept album is the third chapter of The Dark Secret Saga, which began with Symphony of Enchanted Lands II: The Dark Secret.

The artwork for the album was created by Colombian artist Felipe Machado Franco.

In 2021, it was elected by Metal Hammer as the 13th best symphonic metal album of all time.

Track list

Concept
There is a growing fear of war on the horizon for the enchanted lands. The Disciples of the Black Order are gathering their army to unleash their long lost Black Messiah, Nekron, from his prison, to unleash pure evil and chaos upon the world. The wizards of the White Dragon's Order feel it. The White Dragons Order is in possession of the last of the seven black books of Nekron, which they had taken from the dark lands after defeating Nekron and banishing him from the known world. Iras Algor, the first wizard of the White Dragons Order, and Etherus had been studying the seventh book for endless days and nights, trying to decipher the hidden messages within. They finally made a discovery within the writings; The holy white book written by the warrior-angel, Erian, 5000 years ago, what many believed was only a legend, actually existed and that it contained the answers to fully understanding the terrible prophecies of Nekron's seventh black book. However, the book had been taken by the lords of the dark lands when they defeated the army of the Nordic Plains, 3000 years before in the age of the Red Moon. They knew Erian's book needed to be found and retrieved, for it was the only way to stop Nekron from destroying the world.

The White Dragon's Order Summoned three individuals for this challenge; Khaas, Dargor, and the Elvish King, Tarish. With the wizard Iras leading them, the 4 of them together were to set out to find Erian's Book and return it to the White Dragon's Order. After a long journey, they reach the village of "Ainor". It was there the wizard Iras along with the Master Wizard, Erlien, studied many ancient documents and scripts from men and elves who had occupied the Nordic Plains, centuries before. After further study, a terrible discovery was revealed....

The rest of the story is continued on The Cold Embrace of Fear – A Dark Romantic Symphony....

Charts

Credits
Rhapsody of Fire
 Fabio Lione – vocals
 Luca Turilli – guitars, production, cover art
 Alex Staropoli – keyboards, production, cover art
 Patrice Guers – bass
 Alex Holzwarth – drums

Additional personnel
 Dominique Leurquin - additional guitars
 Christopher Lee – narration
 Toby Eddington – narration
 Stash Kirkbride – narration
 Christina Lee – narration
 Marcus D'Amico – narration
 Simon Fielding – narration
 Susannah York – narration
 Manuel Staropoli – baroque recorder
 Søren Leupold – lute
 Bridget Fogle – soprano vocals, choir vocals

Choir
 Herbie Langhans, Previn Moore, Robert Hunecke-Rizzo, Thomas Rettke

Production
 Sascha Paeth – mixing, engineering, editing, additional guitars
 Olaf Reitmeier – engineering, editing, additional guitars
 Simon Oberender – engineering, editing, choir vocals
 Miro – mastering
 Karsten vom Wege – logo
 Felipe Machado Franco – cover art, photography
 Janina Snatzke – photography

References

Rhapsody of Fire albums
2010 albums
Nuclear Blast albums